Bill D. Royer (August 29, 1929 - April 2, 2018) was an American politician in the state of Iowa.

Royer was born in Essex, Iowa. He attended Northwest Missouri State University and was a realtor. He served in the Iowa House of Representatives from 1983 to 1995, as a Republican.

References

1929 births
2018 deaths
People from Page County, Iowa
Northwest Missouri State University alumni
Businesspeople from Iowa
Republican Party members of the Iowa House of Representatives